Nahal Gerar, also Nachal Grar is a wadi in Israel, in the Negev desert. Its Arabic name is Wadi esh-Sheri'a (also Wady el Sharia and other variations). Along this wadi, there are several important ancient Bronze Age archaeological sites. During the Early Iron Age this was an area of Philistine settlement.

Geography

Nahal Gerar begins on the border between the northern Negev and the southwest foothills of Judaean Mountains, near the village of Lahav (ancient site of Tel Halif). Then the wadi flows west near the city of Lehavim, and along the southern edge of a large Bedouin town of Rahat. Then it flows west along the northwestern edge of the Negev towards the town of Netivot, an agricultural area. Near the village of Re'im, it flows into Nahal Besor, of which it is the main affluent.

Nature reserve

The lower river area is now part of the Eshkol National Park, a nature reserve used by tourists. Forest have been replanted there, and hiking trails developed.

The reserve consists of two parts. The first has an area of about 2,000 dunams (2 square kilometers) and is located between Rahat and Tidhar, the other has an area of about 5,500 dunams (5.5 square kilometers) and lies between the villages Ranen and Re'im.

Archaeology

Along Nahal Gerar, there are several important Bronze Age archaeological sites. An archaeological survey and excavation was conducted in 2010 by Noa Shaul on behalf of the Israel Antiquities Authority (IAA). 

The major settlement of this area started at the time of the Egyptian Middle Kingdom, and continued into the New Kingdom, when some significant Egyptian settlements were founded. After the decline of the Egyptian sites, during the Early Iron Age, this area became culturally influenced by the Philistine settlers.

The major sites in this area are Tel Haror/Tell Abu Hareira, and Tel Shera/Tell esh-Sheri'a. Further east along the river, there are also the sites of Tel Halif/Tell el-Khuweilifeh and Tell Beit Mirsim.

Near Tel Haror, in the neighbourhood of the modern town of Tidhar, there are numerous historical mounds, some of them not excavated. Some scholars believe that Tel Haror was the ancient Sharuhen fortress of the Hyksos.

Where Nahal Gerar flows into Nahal Besor, there's the large ancient site of Tell Jemmeh (Tell Gamma).

Biblical connections
Nahal Gerar is named after the Biblical sites mentioned in the Book of Genesis 20.1: "Abraham went thence into the country of Negeb, and settled between Kadesh and Shur; sojourning in Gerar." The city of Gerar is now generally believed to be located at Tel Haror/Tell Abu Hareira.

See also
Battle of Hareira and Sheria
Charge at Sheria
Tel Haror

References

External links
Nahal Gerar: Native Israeli Trees in the Gerar River Gully - description of the valley

Negev
Landforms of Southern District (Israel)
Rivers of Israel
Hebrew Bible rivers
Philistia